Khaleh Sar (also Romanized as Khāleh Sar, also known as Khālsar) is a village in Lat Leyl Rural District, Otaqvar District, Langarud County, Gilan Province, Iran. At the 2006 census, its population was 208, in 60 families.

References 

Populated places in Langarud County